Lucia Traversa (born 31 May 1965) is an Italian former fencer. She won a silver medal in the women's team foil event at the 1988 Summer Olympics.

References

External links
 

1965 births
Living people
Italian female fencers
Olympic fencers of Italy
Fencers at the 1984 Summer Olympics
Fencers at the 1988 Summer Olympics
Olympic silver medalists for Italy
Olympic medalists in fencing
Fencers from Rome
Medalists at the 1988 Summer Olympics
Universiade medalists in fencing
Universiade gold medalists for Italy
Medalists at the 1987 Summer Universiade
20th-century Italian women
21st-century Italian women